
The Ascension Convent in the Kyivan neighbourhood of Podil, also known as the Florivsky, originated in the 16th century as the wooden church of Sts. Florus and Laurus. Its buildings occupy the slopes of the Zamkova Hora. Address: vulytsia Frolivska, 8.

History 
The convent greatly expanded at the time of the Great Northern War, when Peter the Great ordered the relocation of the old Ascension Convent on Pechersk Hill with the aim of building an arsenal there. When run by Ivan Mazepa's mother, the older convent had amassed much property. Its riches and nuns were transferred to the Florovsky Convent.

The main church, or katholikon, is a notable example of Ukrainian Baroque architecture. Its first stone was laid in 1722. Ten years later, the three-domed building was dedicated to the feast of the Ascension of Christ. Its Neoclassical bell-tower is of later construction. 

The wooden buildings of the monastery were entirely destroyed by fire in 1811. Only the katholikon and a 17th-century refectory were left standing amid the ashes. It was Andrey Melensky, a Neoclassical architect from Moscow, who was in charge of the convent's reconstruction. 

The convent's notable residents included Princess Natalia Dolgorukova, one of the first Russian women writers. It was closed in 1929 by the Bolsheviks but reopened after the Germans entered the city in 1941. Several buildings have since been taken over by Soviet industrial enterprises.

References 

Convents in Ukraine
Monasteries of the Ukrainian Orthodox Church (Moscow Patriarchate)
Religious buildings and structures completed in 1732
Residential buildings completed in 1732
Baroque architecture in Kyiv
Neoclassical architecture in Kyiv
Podilskyi District
Neoclassical church buildings in Ukraine